The Higher University of San Simón (Universidad Mayor de San Simón, UMSS) is a university in Cochabamba, Bolivia.

It was founded by Mariscal Andrés de Santa Cruz on November 5, 1832; and is one of the first universities founded in Bolivia after the San Francisco Xavier University from Chuquisaca and the University of San Andrés from La Paz. The University currently offers 99 undergraduate programs in 18 faculties that are mainly established in Cochabamba city. According to uniRank, the University of San Simón ranks second among Bolivian universities, and second according to Webometrics  and the QS World University Rankings.

References

External links

 University of San Simón 

Buildings and structures in Cochabamba
Universities in Bolivia
Education in Cochabamba Department
Educational institutions established in 1832
1832 establishments in South America